Tanvi Lad (born 30 January 1993) is an Indian badminton player who currently plays singles.

Achievements

BWF International Challenge/Series 
Women's singles

  BWF International Challenge tournament
  BWF International Series tournament
  BWF Future Series tournament

References

External links
 

Indian female badminton players
Living people
1993 births
21st-century Indian women
21st-century Indian people
Badminton players at the 2014 Asian Games
Asian Games bronze medalists for India
Asian Games medalists in badminton
Medalists at the 2014 Asian Games
20th-century Indian women